The Comp Air 9 is a turboprop, high-wing, cantilever monoplane with tricycle landing gear produced as a kit for amateur construction by Comp Air.

Design and development 

Operational history
In 2011 there was one Comp Air 9 reported as having been completed. By August 2022, the US Federal Aviation Administration reported none registered. The factory prototype had been registered in 2008 and de-registered in 2018 as its registry had expired and was not renewed. It is possible that no examples of the type remain.

Accidents and incidents
On 19 March 2016, a Comp Air 9 owned by Brazilian entrepreneur and former Vale SA CEO Roger Agnelli crashed shortly after takeoff from Campo de Marte Airport, São Paulo, and exploded on impact, killing all seven on board, including Agnelli and injuring one bystander on the ground.  During the investigation of the crash, it was found that during the assembly process of the PR-ZRA, changes were incorporated to the original design that directly affected the take-off performance of the aircraft.

Specifications (typical Comp Air 9)

References

External links

9
Homebuilt aircraft
1990s United States civil utility aircraft
Single-engined turboprop aircraft
High-wing aircraft
Single-engined tractor aircraft